zth
Abu'l-Qasim ibn Hammud ibn al-Hajar was a senior official or Qaid (Arabic for 'commander') of the Norman Kingdom of Sicily, and a leader of the Arab community of Sicily.

Origin and family
Abu'l-Qasim ibn Hammud was an eminent person: the contemporary traveller Ibn Jubayr called him "the hereditary leader of the Muslims of Sicily", and the chronicler Hugo Falcandus calls him "the most noble and powerful of the Sicilian Muslims". The poet Ibn Qalaqis, who was his guest and client while on the island, claimed that Abu'l-Qasim descended from Muhammad via his daughter Fatimah and Ali ibn Abi Talib, the Idrisid dynasty of Morocco, and the Hammudid dynasty of al-Andalus. However, the explicit link between Abu'l-Qasim's family, the Banu Hajar, and the Hammudids is unknown, and although the claimed ancestors were Shi'a, Abu'l-Qasim himself was most likely Sunni, since he named his sons after the first three caliphs, casting doubts on Ibn Qalaqis' claims. Indeed, Abu'l-Qasim himself is recorded as claiming once to be descended from the Umayyad caliph Umar ibn Abd al-Aziz. Several scholars have tried in the past to link Abu'l-Qasim's ancestry with a certain Chamutus, who defended Enna against the Norman conqueror Roger I in 1087, but this is not substantiated.

He may be the Ibn Abi'l-Qasim who was the patron of Ibn Zafar al-Siqilli, and, to whom the latter dedicated his mirror for princes. Abu'l-Qasim's brother, Abu Ali Hasan, was a scholar and jurist.

Life
The historian Jeremy Johns suggests that Abu'l-Qasim ibn Hammud is first mentioned in a loan agreement of September 1162, where  ('the Qaid Abu'l-Qasim') is mentioned. In 1167, Abu'l-Qasim supported the master chamberlain, Richard the Qaid, in his designs against the chancellor, Stephen du Perche. Falcandus claims that this was because Stephen seemed to favour his rival, the Qaid Sedictus, "the richest of the Muslims" (possibly to be identified with al-Sadid Abu'l-Makarim Hibat Allah ibn al-Husri).

Abu'l-Qasim was a patron of scholars and poets, including Ibn Qalaqis, the poet al-Umawi, and the  Abu Ali Hasan ibn Hammud. Other members of this circle were the judge Abu Abdallah Muhammad ibn Raja and members of the court and government such as Richard the Qaid, the military commander Gharat ibn Jawshan, or the scholar Abu Amr Uthman ibn al-Muhadhdhib al-Judhami.

Abu'l-Qasim clearly had a position at the royal council ( in Arabic), being mentioned twice as its member in documents, in June 1168 and again in November 1173, while Ibn Qalaqis compared him to legendary administrators such as Abd al-Hamid ibn Yahya, or the Buyid viziers Abu'l-Fadl Muhammad ibn al-Husayn, Abu'l-Qasim Isma'il ibn al-Abbas, and Abu Ishaq Ibrahim ibn Hilal. He appears to have fallen from favour at court sometime after, but, according to Ibn Jubayr, in 1184/5 he was still occasionally employed in government affairs. By that time, Abu'l-Qasim had become disillusioned with the prospects of continued Norman rule for the Muslims of Sicily, as the Norman kings exerted pressure on Muslims to convert to Christianity. In 1175, he is known to have sent letters to Saladin urging him to conquer Sicily, and a decade later, shortly before he was met by Ibn Jubayr, he was accused of sending similar proposals to the Almohads of Morocco, and was forced to pay fines and surrender much of his property.

His subsequent fate is unknown, but only four years after his meeting with Ibn Jubayr, the first of a series of Muslim rebellion broke out in Sicily, that would eventually lead to the complete eradication of Islam from the island. Some of his descendants certainly remained on the island, but with Christian names, in the 13th century.

References

Sources 
 

Year of birth unknown
Year of death unknown
12th-century births
12th-century Sicilian people
12th-century Arabs
Sicilian Arabs